Clamp School Detectives is a manga series by Clamp, which was adapted into a 26-episode anime series, produced by Bandai Visual and Pierrot. The anime series has been translated and dubbed into English by the anime television network, Animax, who have broadcast the series across its respective English-language networks in Southeast Asia and South Asia. It is distributed in North America by Bandai Entertainment, which first released it in 1998 through now out-of-print subtitled VHS videotapes, and in 2008 re-released DVDs of the series with a new English dub by Coastal Studios.

Episode list

References 

Clamp School Detectives